The 1988 Maryland Terrapins football team represented the University of Maryland in the 1988 NCAA Division I-A football season. In their second season under head coach Joe Krivak, the Terrapins compiled a 5–6 record, finished in fifth place in the Atlantic Coast Conference, and were outscored by their opponents 304 to 260. The team's statistical leaders included Neil O'Donnell with 1,973 passing yards, Ricky Johnson with 635 rushing yards, and Vernon Joines with 433 receiving yards.

Schedule

References

Maryland
Maryland Terrapins football seasons
Maryland Terrapins football